Allendale is a town in and the county seat of Allendale County, South Carolina, United States. The population was 3,482 at the 2010 census, a decline from 4,052 in 2000.

History
The Allendale County Courthouse, Antioch Christian Church, Erwin House, Gravel Hill Plantation, Red Bluff Flint Quarries, Roselawn, and Smyrna Baptist Church are listed on the National Register of Historic Places.

The artist Jasper Johns lived in Allendale during his childhood in the 1930s and 1940s.  He was raised there by his grandfather, a farmer, and then with his aunt, the only teacher in a two-room school.

In his 2015 book entitled Deep South: Four Seasons on Back Roads, author Paul Theroux describes Allendale as a "ghost town", "poor, neglected, hopeless-looking, a vivid failure."

On April 5, 2022, an intense low-end EF3 tornado impacted the southern and southeast side of the city, causing major damage to several structures and injuring one person. The tornado prompted a rare tornado emergency to be declared for the city by the National Weather Service office in Charleston, South Carolina.

Geography

Demographics

2020 census

As of the 2020 United States census, there were 2,694 people, 1,244 households, and 667 families residing in the town.

2000 census
As of the census of 2000, there were 4,052 people, 1,542 households, and 997 families residing in the town. The population density was 1,225.2 people per square mile (472.7/km2). There were 1,763 housing units at an average density of 533.1 per square mile (205.6/km2). The racial makeup of the town was 18.19% White, 80.03% African American, 0.17% Asian, 0.17% Pacific Islander, 0.96% from other races, and 0.47% from two or more races. Hispanic or Latino of any race were 2.25% of the population.

There were 1,542 households, out of which 32.2% had children under the age of 18 living with them, 29.2% were married couples living together, 31.4% had a female householder with no husband present, and 35.3% were non-families. 31.4% of all households were made up of individuals, and 11.9% had someone living alone who was 65 years of age or older. The average household size was 2.61 and the average family size was 3.34.

In the town, the population was spread out, with 32.6% under the age of 18, 9.7% from 18 to 24, 24.0% from 25 to 44, 21.8% from 45 to 64, and 11.9% who were 65 years of age or older. The median age was 32 years. For every 100 females, there were 84.9 males. For every 100 females age 18 and over, there were 73.7 males.

The median income for a household in the town was $16,632, and the median income for a family was $21,167. Males had a median income of $22,800 versus $20,873 for females. The per capita income for the town was $10,433. About 36.7% of families and 41.2% of the population were below the poverty line, including 59.5% of those under age 18 and 21.1% of those age 65 or over.

Education
Allendale County Schools provides education for elementary, middle and high school students while the University of South Carolina Salkehatchie established in 1965 is the only college in the small town.

Allendale has a public library, a branch of the Allendale Hampton Jasper Regional Library.

Gallery

Media
WEBA-TV/DT, a PBS station serving the South Carolina side of the Central Savannah River Area, is located here.

Notable residents

George B. Daniels (born 1953), federal judge

References

External links

History of Allendale, from Allendale County website

Towns in Allendale County, South Carolina
Towns in South Carolina
County seats in South Carolina